João Teixeira Almeida (born 7 May 1996) is a professional footballer who plays as a midfielder. Born in France, Teixeira represents Portugal internationally.

Club career

Metz
Teixeira is a youth product of Metz, joining the French club when he was twelve years old. He started his football career at the French club's second team, in the summer of 2014. In 2016, after two seasons with Metz B, he terminated his contract by mutual consent.

Later that summer, Teixeira joined fellow Championnat de France Amateur 2 club Sarre-Union, and in the summer of 2017 he moved to Sarreguemines. In August 2018, he moved to Moldovan National Division side Zimbru Chișinău. On 26 August, Teixeira scored his first goal for Zimbru in a 1–0 victory over Speranța Nisporeni.

Politehnica Iași
In February 2019, after only half a year with Zimbru Chișinău, Teixeira moved to Romanian Liga I club Politehnica Iași. On 10 March, he made his debut for Politehnica Iași in a 2–0 league loss against Voluntari.

Oleksandriya
In the summer of 2019, Teixeira moved to Ukrainian Premier League club Oleksandriya.

Career statistics

Club

References

External links

1996 births
Living people
People from Forbach
Portuguese footballers
Portugal youth international footballers
French footballers
French people of Portuguese descent
Association football midfielders
FC Metz players
US Sarre-Union players
Championnat National 2 players
Championnat National 3 players
Moldovan Super Liga players
FC Zimbru Chișinău players
Liga I players
FC Politehnica Iași (2010) players
FC Oleksandriya players
Ukrainian Premier League players
Portuguese expatriate footballers
French expatriate footballers
Sportspeople from Moselle (department)
Footballers from Grand Est
Portuguese expatriate sportspeople in Moldova
Expatriate footballers in Moldova
Portuguese expatriate sportspeople in Romania
Expatriate footballers in Romania
Portuguese expatriate sportspeople in Ukraine
Expatriate footballers in Ukraine
French expatriate sportspeople in Moldova
French expatriate sportspeople in Romania
French expatriate sportspeople in Ukraine